Tremont was a flag stop on the South Shore Line located at Tremont Road  in Porter County, Indiana. The station was built by the Chicago, Lake Shore and South Bend Railway and opened circa 1908, serving its namesake town and later the Indiana Dunes.

In 1979, the Northwestern Indiana Regional Planning Commission and the Northern Indiana Commuter Transportation District (NICTD) conducted a study for the improvement of the South Shore Rail Corridor. The study recommended the construction of new station at Indiana 49 and US 12, a location within  of both the Tremont and  stops. The study also recommended closing Port Chester and  due to low ridership, but keeping the Tremont, and  stations open. Land acquisition for the new station occurred in October 1982.

A new entrance to the Indiana Dunes for bikers and hikers was added at Tremont Road, half a block from the South Shore station, in 1982. The entrance officially opened on the July 4 weekend, coinciding with the expansion of South Shore service to the Tremont station. Two westbound trains were added during the morning rush, four westbound trains on weekends, and one late-night train was added on Saturdays.

As progress continued on Dune Park, plans continued to evolve. By late 1984, NICTD had intended to convert Tremont into a weekend-only stop and have Dune Acres remain a flag stop once Dune Park opened. The following year NICTD changed course, deciding instead to close both Tremont and Dune Acres with the opening of the new Dune Park station. However, ridership increases at both stops after the study was taken caused the agency to consider waiting to close one or both stations until after overflow parking could be added at Dune Park. Dune Acres closed in 1994 once the additional parking lots at Dune Park were complete.

References

Former South Shore Line stations
Former railway stations in Indiana
Railway stations in Porter County, Indiana
Railway stations opened in 1908
Railway stations closed in 1986